Mohammed Dramani Kalilu (born 21 October 1972) is a football player from Ghana. He was a member of the Men's National Team that won the bronze medal at the 1992 Summer Olympics in Barcelona, Spain. He played as a defender.

External links
 
 
 

1972 births
Living people
Ghanaian footballers
Association football defenders
Footballers at the 1992 Summer Olympics
Olympic footballers of Ghana
Olympic bronze medalists for Ghana
Place of birth missing (living people)
Olympic medalists in football
Medalists at the 1992 Summer Olympics